Gente may refer to:

Gente (magazine), an Italian magazine
"Gente" (song), a song by Laura Pausini
Partido de la Gente, a Uruguayan political party, established 2016
Gente y la actualidad, an Argentine magazine
Genté, a commune in France
 La Gente de Aztlan, a UCLA newspaper
 "La gente", a poem by Trilussa

See also
 
 Ghent (disambiguation)
 Gent (disambiguation)